The Watch That Ends the Night: Voices from the Titanic is a fictional retelling of the Titanic, written by Allan Wolf, published October 11, 2011 by Candlewick Press.

Reception 
The book was named one of Booklist's 50 Best YA Books of All Time. It also received starred reviews from Kirkus, Horn Book, and Booklist, as well as the following accolades:

 Booklist Editors' Choice: Books for Youth (2011)
 American Library Association's (ALA) Best Fiction for Young Adults (2012)
 Bank Street College Claudia Lewis Award for Older Readers (2012)
 Pennsylvania Young Readers' Choice Award Nominee for Young Adults (2013)
 ALA's Amazing Audiobooks for Young Adults Top Ten (2013)
 Children's Book Council: Reading Beyond Booklist
 Young Adult Library Services Association's Outstanding Books for the College Bound
 North Carolina School Library Media Association Young Adult Book Award
 National Council for the Social Studies Notable Social Studies Trade Books for Young People

References 

American young adult novels
American historical novels
2011 American novels
Candlewick Press books